Vomitorial Corpulence was a grindcore band that originated in Melbourne, Australia. The band was started by Paul Green. The band's name is inpired by Revelation 3:15-16. Vomitorial Corpulence is widely known as one of the first Christian grindcore bands.

Background and impact
Vomitorial Corpulence started in 1992 as a vision of guitarist and vocalist Paul Green, but did not get moving until 1993, when he hired on bassist Mark Hamilton and drummer Alexander O'Neil. O'Neil quit in 1995 and was replaced by Christopher Valentine. O’Neil formed the unblack metal project Vomoth. The band recorded their debut album, Skin Stripper, before going on hiatus for the first time.  The album includes two bluegrass banjo tracks composed by Mike Keady. In December 2001, Green moved to Minnesota and married Maria, who became the band's bassist, and hired on Ziggy Peters and Johnathan Kellerman on vocals. Due to lack of a drummer, the band went on a second hiatus. In August 2006, Green started the band back up with Hamilton and Valentine.  The band ended in 2008.

Alexander O'Neil, the band's former drummer, joined Cryptal Darkness and Desolate Eternity after departing from the band. Valentine ran the label known as Christ Core Records, which signed the act Flactorophia.

Members
Last known lineup
 Paul Green - guitars, vocals (1993–2008)
 Mark Hamilton - bass (1993–1999, 2006–2008)
 Chris Valentine - drums (1995–1999, 2006–2008)

Former
 Alexander O'Neil - drums (1993–1995)
 Ziggy Peters - vocals (2001–2003)
 Joshua Kellerman - vocals (2001–2003)
 Maria Green - bass (2001–2003)

Timeline

Discography
Studio albums
 Karrionic Hacktician (1995)
 Skin Stripper (1998, Christ Core Records)
 Karrionic Hacktician (2006, Christ Core)
 Skin Decomposition (2007, Christ Core/Vomit Bucket; split with Vomitous Discharge, Flactorophia, Engravor, Eternal Mystery, Demonic Dismemberment)

EPs
 Pathetic Prolification (1997)

References

External links
 Retrieved on 14 October 2016.

Musical groups established in 1993
Musical groups disestablished in 2008
Australian musical trios
Australian Christian metal musical groups
Rowe Productions artists
Grindcore musical groups